Embalse is a city in the center-west of the province of Córdoba, Argentina, located within the Calamuchita Valley, 119 km south-southwest from Córdoba City.

The word embalse means "reservoir" (i. e. artificial lake) in Spanish. Embalse is located along the eastern shore of a large reservoir produced by the damming of the Río Tercero. The dam was inaugurated in 1930; it is 58 m high and 125 m long, with a maximum capacity of 730 million m³. The reservoir has an area of 58 km² and is employed for fishing, irrigation and the production of hydroelectricity, as well as water sports. On the southern shore lies the Embalse nuclear power plant, one of the two operational nuclear plants of Argentina (the other is Atucha I).

The area is of major touristic importance. Accordingly, Embalse has 7 hotels and many smaller accommodation facilities, and a casino (opened in 1984).

References
 
 Portal de Embalse, Valle de Calamuchita
 Fernanda Gariela Biolé, Adriana Olmedo, Fernando Julio Biolé. (2002). Historia de la construcción del Embalse de Río Tercero, Córdoba, Argentina.  Libro completo.

Populated places in Córdoba Province, Argentina
Populated places established in 1911